Various seaside municipalities operate fireboats in Connecticut.
Following the attacks on September 11, 2001 several municipalities received grants from the US Federal government to build fireboats, so they would be prepared for a maritime terrorist attack.

References